Beef Manhattan is a Midwestern American dish consisting of roast beef and  gravy.  It is often served with mashed potatoes either on top of the steak or on the side of the plate. A variation on this dish is Turkey Manhattan, which substitutes turkey for the roast beef. The dish is named after Manhattan, but it is not known as such there; dishes like it are usually called "open-face sandwiches" in New York City.

The dish was first served in a restaurant under the name "Beef Manhattan" in a now-defunct Indianapolis deli in the late 1940s where it gained traction as a Hoosier staple. The dish was named by Naval Ordnance Plant, Indianapolis (NOPI) workers who were trained on a fabrication of the Norden bombsight in Manhattan during World War II. They enjoyed the open-faced sandwich they had in Manhattan and brought it back to their cafeteria as the "Beef Manhattan".  In Indiana, it is served on bread. The roast beef is sliced and put on the bread like a sandwich, then cut corner to corner and plated in a V shape. Mashed potatoes are served between the two halves, and the whole is covered in gravy.

See also
 List of beef dishes

References

Culture of Indianapolis
American meat dishes